Ekaterina Sloeva (born 23 May 1999) is a Belarusian speed skater. She represented Belarus at the 2022 Winter Olympics.

Career
Sloeva made her international debut at the 2021 European Speed Skating Championships. She competed at the 2022 European Speed Skating Championships where she won a silver medal in the women's team sprint event.

Sloeva represented Belarus at the 2022 Winter Olympics in the 1500 metres and finished with a time of 1:58.41.

References

1999 births
Living people
Belarusian female speed skaters
Sportspeople from Irkutsk
Olympic speed skaters of Belarus
Speed skaters at the 2022 Winter Olympics
21st-century Belarusian women